In mathematics, a handle decomposition of a 3-manifold allows simplification of the original 3-manifold into pieces which are easier to study.

Heegaard splittings
An important method used to decompose into handlebodies is the Heegaard splitting, which gives us  a decomposition in two handlebodies of equal genus.

Examples
As an example: lens spaces are orientable 3-spaces and allow decomposition into two solid tori, which are genus-one-handlebodies. The genus one non-orientable space is a space which is the union of two solid Klein bottles and corresponds to the twisted product of the 2-sphere and the 1-sphere: .

Orientability
Each orientable 3-manifold is the union of exactly two orientable handlebodies; meanwhile, each non-orientable one needs three orientable handlebodies.

Heegaard genus
The minimal genus of the glueing boundary determines what is known as the Heegaard genus. For non-orientable spaces an interesting invariant is the tri-genus.

References

J.C. Gómez Larrañaga, W. Heil, V.M. Núñez. Stiefel-Whitney surfaces and decompositions of 3-manifolds into handlebodies, Topology Appl. 60 (1994), 267-280.
J.C. Gómez Larrañaga, W. Heil, V.M. Núñez. Stiefel-Whitney surfaces and the trigenus  of non-orientable 3-manifolds, Manuscripta Math. 100 (1999), 405-422.

3-manifolds
Topology